Fantasmagoriana is a French anthology of German ghost stories, translated anonymously by Jean-Baptiste Benoît Eyriès and published in 1812. Most of the stories are from the first two volumes of Johann August Apel and Friedrich Laun's  (1810–1811), with other stories by Johann Karl August Musäus and Heinrich Clauren.

It was read by Lord Byron, Mary Shelley, Percy Bysshe Shelley, John William Polidori and Claire Clairmont at the Villa Diodati in Cologny, Switzerland, during June 1816, the Year Without a Summer, and inspired them to write their own ghost stories, including "The Vampyre" (1819), and Frankenstein (1818), both of which went on to shape the Gothic horror genre.

Title 
This is appended with the suffix , which "denotes a collection of objects or information relating to a particular individual, subject, or place".

The subtitle "" translates as "anthology of stories of apparitions of spectres, revenants, phantoms, etc.; translated from the German by an amateur".

The book and its title went on to inspire others by different authors, named in a similar vein: Spectriana (1817), Démoniana (1820) and Infernaliana (1822).

Stories
Eyriès chose a selection of eight German ghost stories to translate for a French audience. The first story ("") was from Johann Karl August Musäus' satirical retellings of traditional folk tales  (1786). The next ("") was by Johann August Apel, first published in Johann Friedrich Kind's  (1805), but reprinted in Apel's anthology  (1810). Of the remaining six tales, five were from the first two volumes of Apel and Laun's  (1810–1811), and one ("") was by the highly popular author Heinrich Clauren, which had been parodied by Apel in one of his  stories ("", translated as ""). Three editions in three countries and languages over a period of three years shows that these ghost stories were very popular.

List of stories

References

1812 anthologies
Horror anthologies
German horror fiction
French horror fiction
Translations into French
German short story collections
Works published anonymously
German anthologies